MEDINA (short for Model EDitor Interactive for Numerical Simulation Analysis) is a universal pre-/postprocessor for finite element analysis.

The development of MEDINA started in the early 1990s at Daimler-Benz AG and was  proceeded at  debis Systemhaus.  Since 2001 the support and the development of MEDINA takes place by T-Systems International GmbH. The current release is MEDINA Rel. 9.0.1.2

Architecture and interfaces 
MEDINA was designed as general purpose pre-/postprocessor for various areas of finite element analysis supporting most of the common CAD-formats, solvers and operating systems.

CAD-formats supported 
Currently, the following CAD-formats are supported by MEDINA:
 CATIA
 IGES
 JT
 SAT (ACIS)
 STEP
 STL
 VDA-FS

Further CAD-formats can be supported using the solution for 3D data conversion of T-Systems called COM/FOX.

FEA interfaces supported 
In the current release, particularly the following solvers are supported by MEDINA:
 Abaqus
 ANSYS
 AutoSEA
 LS-DYNA
 Marc
 Nastran
 PAM-CRASH
 PATRAN
 Star-CD
 SYSTUS
 Universal
 VECTIS
 PERMAS

OS and hardware supported 
In the current release, MEDINA is running under the following operating systems and hardware architectures:
 Linux
 Microsoft Windows

FE-analysis in MEDINA 
Particularly, MEDINA is being used for the following tasks of FE-analysis:
 Crash simulations;
 durability analysis (thermal and mechanical loading);
 NVH (Noise Vibration Harshness);
 simulations about pedestrian safety and passenger protection.

MEDINA consists of two modules: 
 a FEM preprocessor (MEDINA.Pre) and
 a FEM postprocessor (MEDINA.Post).

In the preprocessor all steps are taken before the computation can start, i.e.:
 Import of geometry data from CAD system;
 Import of associated meta data from the CAD-system or PDM-system;
 Import of FE-models;
 Editing and repair of CAD geometry;
 Meshing;
 Model structuring;
 Definition of material parameters;
 Definition of boundary conditions;
 Definition of load cases;
 Generation of the solver specific input deck.

In the postprocessor all steps are taken after the computation of the primary data of the solver is finished, e.g.:
 Determination of the derived secondary data;
 Illustration of the results (graphics, animations);
 Export functionalities;
 Generation of reports.

Characteristics 
MEDINA was designed to support complex simulation tasks and huge FE models—found typically in automotive and aerospace industries—with high performance.

Important design elements to achieve high performance are parts structures and connector elements.
 Parts enable a 1:1 mapping of the product structure of the CAD-/PDM-system within the FE model.
 Connector elements are used for the generic as well as solver and client specific modeling of assembling techniques like welding, bolting, bonding.

Within the process step of the so-called "model assembly" the single FE-components (parts structures and connector elements) are merged to the complex comprehensive FE-model representing complex products like vehicles, aircraft, etc.

Single process steps or complete process chains can be automated by protocol and script techniques. Dynamic commands enable to integrate client specific plug-ins within the standard functionality of MEDINA.

Target groups/user groups 
Due to the development roots of MEDINA and the included functionalities for the analysis of huge FE-models MEDINA is a widely used pre-/postprocessor for FE analysis especially in automotive industries.

Furthermore, MEDINA is used in aerospace, manufacturing industries, engineering service providers and universities.

References

External links 
 https://web.archive.org/web/20110827013759/https://servicenet.t-systems.com/medina - official MEDINA web site (in English)

Finite element software